David Alexander Webster Lawson (born 25 September 1978) is an Australian comedian, actor, and TV and radio personality. He is a regular performer on the stand up comedy circuit, and at one time participated in a talk back radio segment on the commercial radio station Nova 100.

Early life 
Lawson grew up in the Bayside area of Melbourne and completed his secondary education at Haileybury College. He performed in the band Born Backwards.

Career
Lawson is known for his long involvement in hosting the Nickelodeon Australia shows Saturday Nick Television, Sarvo, Nick Takes Over Your School and Camp Orange. He also co-hosted with fellow Sarvo host James Kerley and Sophie Monk for the 2006 Nickelodeon Australian Kids' Choice Awards. On 16 February 2007, he announced his intention to leave Nickelodeon Australia, although several remarks by Kerley hinted that Lawson might return at a later stage.

Lawson returned to television work in April 2008, co-hosting The Dave & Kerley Show with James Kerley on Channel V at 10am on Sunday mornings. He was also a host and participant in the Ten Network's Guerrilla Gardeners, in which, because of his experience, he was hired primarily "to spin lines to the councils [attempting to stop the show] when they turned up".

He also appeared in the Toyota Memorable Moments series of television commercials, depicting great moments in the history of Australian rules football with fellow comedian Stephen Curry. Curry plays the straight man, while an over-enthusiastic Lawson annoys, and is usually hurt by, the players as they recreate the scenes. Lawson also appeared in the music videos for Alex Lloyd's "Green", Duncan James's "Speed of Life", and Gerling's "Dust Me Selecta".

Lawson is a great-grandson of the Australian poet and author Henry Lawson, and is reputed to have fashioned his laconic persona from several of his great-grandfather's ideas as expressed in such works as "The Cant and Dirt of Labour Literature" (1894), "The Advanced Idealist" (1895), "Diogenes" (1900), and "The Casual Australian" (1922).

Lawson has been awarded the coveted Comedy Custodians Award for Best New Talent for his comedy show entitled "Life as Henry Lawson's Grandson and other funny things about me".

Lawson appeared on the 2013 ABC comedy series It's a Date, along with Poh Ling Yeow, and in the 2014 ABC comedy Utopia.

Personal life
In 2021, Lawson married Succession actor Sarah Snook in a private wedding in Brooklyn. The pair have been together since 2020.

Filmography

Film

Television

References 

1978 births
Australian stand-up comedians
Living people
Comedians from Melbourne
Australian VJs (media personalities)
People educated at Haileybury and Imperial Service College